Kenneth William Wookey (23 February 1922 – 11 January 2003) was a Welsh professional footballer who played as a winger.

Career
Born in Newport, Wookey began his professional career with his hometown club Newport County, where he made a total of 14 appearances in the English Football League. Wookey left Newport in December 1946 to join Bristol Rovers, in a swap deal involving Wilf Smith. Over the next two seasons, Wookey made 54 appearances in the League for Bristol. Wookey's next team was Swansea Town, where he spent two seasons, making 13 appearances in the League. After a brief spell in non-League football with Hereford United, Wookey spent one final season in the League with Ipswich Town, making 15 appearances.

Wookey also represented Wales at schoolboy level.

Personal life
His son, also named Ken, was also a professional footballer.

References

1922 births
2003 deaths
Welsh footballers
Newport County A.F.C. players
Bristol Rovers F.C. players
Swansea City A.F.C. players
Hereford United F.C. players
Ipswich Town F.C. players
English Football League players
Association football wingers
Footballers from Newport, Wales